Belmont Township is a township in Kingman County, Kansas, USA.  As of the 2000 census, its population was 92.

Geography
Belmont Township covers an area of 36.75 square miles (95.19 square kilometers); of this, 0.02 square miles (0.05 square kilometers) or 0.05 percent is water.

Adjacent townships
 Ninnescah Township (north and northeast)
 Richland Township (east)
 Valley Township (southeast)
 Chikaskia Township (south)
 Rochester Township (southwest)
 Peters Township (west)
 Union Township (northwest)

Cemeteries
The township contains one cemetery, Cleveland.

References
 U.S. Board on Geographic Names (GNIS)
 United States Census Bureau cartographic boundary files

External links
 US-Counties.com
 City-Data.com

Townships in Kingman County, Kansas
Townships in Kansas